The Chef & Brewer collection is a collection of over 140 licensed pub restaurants in the United Kingdom, owned by the Greene King subsidiary, the Spirit Pub Company. They provide more upmarket pub food, specials and cask ales and a number of them have recently been re-furbished.

History
Grand Metropolitan, which later formed part of Diageo, sold the estate that became Chef & Brewer pubs to Scottish & Newcastle in 1993 in a part cash, part debentures deal of £708 million. In 2003, Scottish & Newcastle auctioned off the Chef & Brewer chain, which was acquired by the Spirit Group. In 2005 the Spirit Group was acquired by Punch Taverns. In 2011 the Chef & Brewer chain became part of Spirit Pub Company plc following its demerger from Punch Taverns. The Spirit Pub Company plc was acquired by Greene King in June 2015.

The pubs are known for their family friendly atmosphere and have recently featured in Tesco Clubcard promotions.

Locations
Many of the pubs operated by Chef & Brewer are historic pub/inn locations:
The Barley Mow, Clifton Hampden, Oxfordshire, dating to 1352.
 The De Trafford Arms in Alderley Edge dates back over 200 years 
 The Griffin, Widnes, An 18th century inn on the old Warrington to Prescot turnpike road at Bold Heath, once part of the distinguished Bold family estate. Previously a Fayre & Square pub, it was re-branded and completely re-furbished in 2016.  
 Hutt in Ravenshead was built in 1400 
 Cross Keys in Cleveland became a coaching Inn in 1800
 The Traveller's Rest in Nottingham served as a half-way house for herders of the Goose Fair.
 The Ferry Inn in Wilford, Nottingham, serving the namesake ferry crossing chartered by Edward III that served the city for centuries
 Unicorn in Cheshire dates back over 100 years
 Romper in Altrincham dates back 450 years
 The Blundell Arms in Bolton dates back to at least the early 15th century
 The frontage of the Nags Head in Burntwood dates back to 1650 
 Gatwick Manor in Crawley dates back to the 15th century

References

External links
  Official Website - Chef & Brewer
  Official YouTube Channel - Chef & Brewer

Restaurant groups in the United Kingdom
Pub chains